The Voice Kids is an Albanian television talent show created by John de Mol and based on the concept The Voice Kids Netherlands. It is part of an international series. It began airing on Top Channel on March 29, 2013 and ended on May 24, 2013. After four years of absence, on January 19, 2018 Top channel premiered the second season.

Format
There are 4 stages to the competition:
Pre-Auditions
The first stage of the show is not broadcast. The producers of the show audition all the artists that submitted their selves through the form on the website. The selected by the producers artists proceed to the blind auditions where they have to perform for the coaches.
Blind Auditions
The second phase is the "Blind Auditions". There, the children have to sing alone in front of live audiences. The 3 jury members are sitting in a swivel chair with their back to the stage and cannot see the candidates. During the performance, they can elect to support a candidate by pressing a buzzer, which will automatically turn their seat towards the stage. The candidate continues to the next round if he or she receives at least one of the three jury votes. The candidate chooses a coach for the further rounds from all jury members who supported him or her.
Battle Rounds
It follows a training week in which the coaches prepare their candidates called the "Battle Round" third phase. In the Battle Round three candidates of the same coaching group to sing a song in the trio. Only one of the three candidates is further decision of the respective coaches.
Live Shows
The final phase are the "Live Shows" and there are six finalists per team. They sing in consultation with their coach. The coach decide for his/her/their team which two acts goes in the next stage. The audience at home can then vote on which two act has to go to the next stage.

In the semi-final phase each coach has four artists in his/her/their teams. Each act sing a song and the audience at home can then vote on which two per team advanced to final phase.

In the final stage, there's still two finalists per team. The winner will be named using televoting by the public at home to "The Voice Kids Albania".

History
In 2012, along with the announcement that The Voice of Albania goes for a second season on Top Channel, it was announced that the network had ordered The Voice Kids, a junior spinoff featuring younger aspiring singers.

After 4 years on the final of Adult version in sixth season, Top Channel announced that the show comes back in Albania with a second season. After attaining high ratings, it was announced that the network had renewed The Voice Kids for a third season.

Selection process
The open auditions application for the first series closed in November 2012, with the age limit being 6–14 years old. The show began staging producers' audition days in October–November 2012 across the Albania and Kosovo, with the blind auditions beginning filming in January 2013.

The open auditions application for the second season opened on the final of Adult version in sixth season and closed in October 2017, with the age limit being 6–14 years old. The show began staging producers' audition days in September–October 2017 across the Albania and Kosovo, with the blind auditions beginning filming on December 8, 2017.

The open auditions application for the third season opened on the final of Kid's version in second season and closed in June 2018, with the age limit being 6–14 years old. The show began staging producers' audition days in June 2018 across the Albania and Kosovo, with the blind auditions beginning filming on December 16, 2018.

Coaches and hosts

Coaches

Hosts

 Key
 Main host
 Backstage host

Coaches' teams 
  – Winning Coach/Contestant. Winners are in bold, eliminated contestants in small font. 
  – Runner-Up Coach/Contestant. Final contestant first listed.
  – Third Place Coach/Contestant. Final contestant first listed.

Season summary
Artist's info

 Team Altin
 Team Elton
 Team Alma

 Team Miriam
 Team Eneda
 Team Aleksandër & Renis
 Team Arilena

Season 1 (2013)
The first season of The Voice Kids Albania premiered on March 29, 2013 and ended on May 24, 2013 on Top Channel. The coaches were Altin Goci, Elton Deda and Alma Bektashi. The host was Xhemi Shehu. The winner of the first kids version in Albania was Rita Thaçi from Team Alma.

Season 2 (2018)

The second season of The Voice Kids Albania premiered on January 19, 2018 and ended on April 20, 2018 on Top Channel. The coaches were Miriam Cani, Eneda Tarifa and Aleksandër & Renis Gjoka. The host was Ledion Liço. The V-Reporter was Dojna Mema. The winner of the second kids version in Albania was Denis Bonjaku from Team Miriam.

Season 3 (2019)

The third season of The Voice Kids Albania premiered on January 18, 2019 and ended on April 19, 2019 on Top Channel. The coaches were Miriam Cani, Aleksandër & Renis Gjoka and Arilena Ara. The host was Dojna Mema and the V-reporter was Flori Gjini. The winner of the third kids version in Albania was Altea Ali from Team Gjoka.

See also
 Top Channel
 The Voice (TV series)
 The Voice Kids
 The Voice of Albania

References

 
Albania Kids
2013 Albanian television series debuts
2013 Albanian television series endings
2018 Albanian television series debuts
2019 Albanian television series endings
2010s Albanian television series
Albanian reality television series
Top Channel original programming
Television series about children
Television series about teenagers